Love Songs brings together tracks from throughout Nat "King" Cole's recording career with Capitol records. The swing pianist turned ballad vocalist had a prolific chart run in the 1950s. Six of his UK hits are featured here.

Track listing

 "When I Fall in Love" (Victor Young, Edward Heyman) – 3:11
 "Unforgettable" (Irving Gordon) – 3:28
 "The Very Thought of You" (Ray Noble) – 3:48
 "Too Young" (Sidney Lippman, Sylvia Dee) – 3:25
 "Let's Fall in Love" (Harold Arlen, Ted Koehler) – 2:47
 "The More I See You" (Harry Warren, Mack Gordon) – 3:28
 "Stay As Sweet As You Are" (Mack Gordon, Harry Revel) – 2:58
 "Love Is a Many-Splendored Thing" (Sammy Fain, Paul Francis Webster) – 2:40
 "Walkin' My Baby Back Home" (Gordon, Revel) - 2:40
 "You're My Everything" (Mort Dixon, Warren, Young) – 2:49
 "Because You're Mine" (Nicholas Brodzsky, Sammy Cahn) – 3:13
 "Around the World" (Harold Adamson, Victor Young) – 2:33
 "A Nightingale Sang in Berkeley Square" (Eric Maschwitz, Manning Sherwin, Jack Strachey) – 4:44
 "It's All in the Game" (Charles Dawes, Carl Sigman) – 3:06
 "You Made Me Love You" (James V. Monaco, Joseph McCarthy) – 2:55
 "For All We Know" (J. Fred Coots, Sam M. Lewis) - 3:16 (Nat King Cole Trio)
 "There Goes My Heart" (Benny Davis, Abner Silver) – 2:52
 "Love Letters" (Victor Young, Edward Heyman) – 2:43
 "Answer Me" (Gerhard Winkler, Fred Rauch, Carl Sigman) – 2:56
 "Orange Colored Sky" (Warren, Gordon) – 2:33
 "Stardust" (Hoagy Carmichael, Mitchell Parish) – 3:15
 "Autumn Leaves" (Joseph Kosma, Jacques Prévert, Johnny Mercer) – 2:40
 "These Foolish Things" (Harry Link, Holt Marvell, Jack Strachey) – 3:46 
 "You'll Never Know" (Warren, Gordon) – 2:42
 "Let There Be Love" (Lionel Rand, Ian Grant) – 2:45 (Nat King Cole & George Shearing Quintet)
 "More" (Riz Ortolani, Nino Oliviero, Marcello Diociolini, Norman Newell) – 2:07
 "L-O-V-E" (Gordon, Revel) – 2:31
 "I Wish You Love" (Warren, Gordon) – 2:54

Personnel
Nat King Cole – vocals
Les Baxter – arranger
Ralph Carmichael – arranger, conductor
Lee Gillette – producer
Gordon Jenkins – arranger, conductor
Bob Norberg – digital remastering
Nelson Riddle – arranger, conductor

Certifications

References

Nat King Cole albums
2003 compilation albums
Albums arranged by Nelson Riddle
Albums arranged by Gordon Jenkins
Albums arranged by Ralph Carmichael
Capitol Records compilation albums